Kalāheo High School is a public high school in Kailua CDP, City and County of Honolulu, Hawaiʻi, United States, on the island of Oʻahu.

The school building opened as an intermediate school in 1966, but was repurposed as a high school in 1973.  The school mascot is the Mustang, and the school colors are blue and orange.  Some graduating classes have had all blue or all orange graduation gowns and caps.

The campus has the glazed ceramic tile sculpture Spirit of the Koʻolaus by Claude Horan.

Notable alumni

 Ashley Hobbs, Class of 2007; Playboy Playmate, December 2010.
 Christine Snyder, Class of 1987, United Airlines Flight 93. 
 Irie Love, Class of 2000;  reggae singer.
 Jonah Ray, Class of 2000; comedian, writer.
 Justin Young, Class of 1996; singer and songwriter of Hawaiian, pop, and reggae music.
 Kelvin Jones, Class of 2003, director of the LSU Tiger Marching Band. 1st African American head marching band director in SEC history.
 Mike Akiu, Class of 1980; football player.
 Siupeli Malamala, football offensive lineman.
 Stacy Kamano, Class of 1992; actress.

Athletics
Kalaheo High School competes in a variety of sports. They compete in the Oahu Interscholastic Association. These sports include:

Air Riflery
Baseball (JV & Varsity)
Basketball
Bowling
Cheerleading
Cross-Country
Football (JV & Varsity)
Golf
Judo
Paddling
Soccer
Softball (JV & Varsity)
Soft Tennis
Swimming
Tennis (JV & Varsity)
Track and Field
Volleyball
Water Polo
Wrestling

References

External links
 Kalaheo High

Public high schools in Honolulu County, Hawaii
Educational institutions established in 1966
1966 establishments in Hawaii